Eraldo Pizzo (born 21 April 1938) is an Italian water polo player who competed in the 1960 Summer Olympics, in the 1964 Summer Olympics, in the 1968 Summer Olympics, and in the 1972 Summer Olympics.

Biography
He was born in Rivarolo Ligure, Genoa. In 1960, he was a member of the Italian water polo team which won the gold medal. He played six matches and scored seven goals.

Four years later he finished fourth with the Italian team in the water polo competition at the Tokyo Games. He played six matches and scored five goals.

At the 1968 Games he was part of the Italian team which finished again fourth in the Olympic water polo tournament. He played all nine matches and scored 29 goals.

His last Olympic appearance was at the Munich Games where he finished sixth with the Italian team in the 1972 water polo competition. He played all eight matches and scored 12 goals.

Awards
On 7 May 2015, in the presence of the President of Italian National Olympic Committee (CONI), Giovanni Malagò, was inaugurated in the Olympic Park of the Foro Italico in Rome, along Viale delle Olimpiadi, the Walk of Fame of Italian sport, consisting of 100 tiles that chronologically report names of the most representative athletes in the history of Italian sport. On each tile are the name of the sportsman, the sport in which he distinguished himself and the symbol of CONI. One of these tiles is dedicated to Eraldo Pizzo.

See also
 Italy men's Olympic water polo team records and statistics
 List of Olympic champions in men's water polo
 List of Olympic medalists in water polo (men)
 List of players who have appeared in multiple men's Olympic water polo tournaments
 List of men's Olympic water polo tournament top goalscorers
 List of members of the International Swimming Hall of Fame
 Legends of Italian sport - Walk of Fame

References

External links
 
 

1938 births
Living people
Water polo players from Genoa
Italian male water polo players
Water polo players at the 1960 Summer Olympics
Water polo players at the 1964 Summer Olympics
Water polo players at the 1968 Summer Olympics
Water polo players at the 1972 Summer Olympics
Olympic gold medalists for Italy in water polo
Medalists at the 1960 Summer Olympics
People from Rivarolo Ligure